The brown-breasted gerygone or treefern gerygone (Gerygone ruficollis) is a species of bird in the family Acanthizidae.
It is found in the highlands of New Guinea.
Its natural habitat is subtropical or tropical moist montane forests.

References

brown-breasted gerygone
Birds of New Guinea
brown-breasted gerygone
Taxonomy articles created by Polbot